Thailand women's national under-17 football team is a Thailand women's association football youth team for women soccer player aged under 17 or 16.

Competitive record

AFC U-17 Women's Asian Cup 
Source

AFF U-16 Women's Championship

See also
 Thailand women's national football team
 Thailand women's national under-20 football team

References

External links

 Official website
 FIFA profile

Asian women's national under-17 association football teams
U